Howard Curtis Nielson (September 12, 1924 – May 20, 2020) was an American politician in the Republican Party. From 1983 to 1991, Nielson represented Utah's 3rd congressional district in the United States House of Representatives.

Early life
Nielson was born in Richfield, Utah; his paternal grandparents were immigrants from Denmark. After graduating from Richfield High School in 1942, he served as a sergeant in the United States Army Air Forces during World War II from 1943 to 1946. He continued his education, earning his B.S. from the University of Utah in 1947, M.S. from the University of Oregon in 1949, and M.B.A. and Ph.D from Stanford University in 1956 and 1958, respectively.

He later founded the Department of Statistics at Brigham Young University, Provo.

Political career
Nielson first served in political office as a member of the Utah House of Representatives from 1967 to 1974, serving as Speaker of the House in his last term. He was an associate commissioner on the Utah Commission for Higher Education for two years. He was a delegate to the Utah State Republican Conventions from 1960 to 1982.

He was elected as a Republican to the United States House of Representatives from Utah and served four terms, from January 3, 1983 to January 3, 1991. While in Congress, Nielson sponsored two resolutions calling on Israel to reopen Palestinian schools and colleges. In 1985 he was one of just two "nay" voters on a resolution urging Taiwan to extradite gangster Chen Chi-li, who had murdered dissident journalist Henry Liu in San Francisco the previous year. He also cosponsored a bill to limit tobacco advertising. He also was a leading proponent of releasing the names of people who tested positive for AIDS to Public Health Officials. Nielson was also one of the main negotiators of the 1990 Clean Air Act. Nielson was an early promoter of rating of song lyrics.

In 1996, Nielson was elected to the Utah State Senate. He retired from Congress so he could serve as a missionary for The Church of Jesus Christ of Latter-day Saints with his wife. They served as missionaries in both Australia and Hungary.

Personal life
Nielson and his wife Julia had seven children, three sons and four daughters.

Nielson's first wife died in 2003. He later married Donna Esther Brown, herself a widow and the sister of one of his former House colleagues, Ron Packard of California. Donna died in 2015 of bone marrow cancer. Howard Nielson died on May 20, 2020 at the age of 95.

One of Nielson's children, Howard Jr., is a Judge on the United States District Court for the District of Utah beginning in 2019.

See also
 54th Utah State Legislature

References

External links

|-

1924 births
2020 deaths
20th-century American politicians
20th-century Mormon missionaries
Latter Day Saints from Utah
United States Army Air Forces personnel of World War II
American Mormon missionaries in Australia
American Mormon missionaries in Hungary
American people of Danish descent
Brigham Young University faculty
Republican Party members of the Utah House of Representatives
Military personnel from Utah
People from Richfield, Utah
Politicians from Provo, Utah
Republican Party members of the United States House of Representatives from Utah
Speakers of the Utah House of Representatives
Stanford University alumni
United States Army Air Forces soldiers
University of Oregon alumni
University of Utah alumni
Republican Party Utah state senators